The Zanzibar beaked snake (Letheobia pallida) is a species of blind snake in the Typhlopidae family. It is endemic to Africa.

Notes

References
 Cope, E.D. 1869. Observations on REPTILES of the Old World. Art. II. Proc. Acad. Nat. Sci. Philadelphia, Volume "1868" [20]:316-323.
  Abstract

Letheobia
Reptiles described in 1869